Niuta Teitelbaum (1917–1943), nicknamed Little Wanda with the braids,  was a Jewish resistance fighter in Warsaw, Poland during World War II. During the war she acted as a courier for the Jewish Combat Organization and the Communist Gwardia Ludowa (GL), and also smuggled weapons and people.
As a resistance fighter, she was "known to braid her hair, dress up as a Polish peasant girl, and enter homes and offices in disguise to kill Nazis". In 1943 Teitelbaum shot five Nazi soldiers in one day. During the war she was wanted by the Gestapo, who placed a bounty of 150,000 złotys on her head. She is reputed to have placed a bomb in Warsaw's Kammerlichtspiele Cinema, which was frequented by Nazi soldiers, in January 1943.

Her story was told in the 2021 book The Light of Days: The Untold Story of Women Resistance Fighters in Hitler's Ghettos by Judy Batalion. The veracity of some of the claims about her life and activities have been questioned, among others by Polish historian .

References

1917 births
1943 deaths
Polish resistance members of World War II
Jewish resistance members during the Holocaust
Polish women in World War II resistance
Jewish women activists